Christian Ressler (born 13 July 1991) is an Austrian footballer who plays for SV Mattersburg.

External links
 
 

Austrian footballers
Austrian Football Bundesliga players
SV Mattersburg players
1991 births
Living people
Association football forwards